Richie Williams (born March 10, 1983) is a former American Canadian football quarterback, and is now a jack man for Jamie McMurray in the Monster Energy Cup Series stock car racing leagues. He was originally signed as a free agent by the Hamilton Tiger-Cats after a collegiate career at Appalachian State University.

College career
Williams became Appalachian State's starting quarterback during his junior year in 2004 in which the Mountaineers finished with a disappointing 6–5 overall record. However, on October 9, 2004, against Furman University, Williams completed 40 of 45 passes thrown for an all divisions NCAA record for single game accuracy. Additionally, he completed 28 straight passes which also established an NCAA mark.

The 2005 season saw the fortunes of the Mountaineers turn around as Williams led the team to a 12–3 record and the 2005 NCAA Division I Football Championship. It was the first NCAA national title won by a college football team from North Carolina. He was honored with the Southern Conference Offensive Player of the Year Award in November 2005. Williams also received the coveted Bob Waters Award as the Southern Conference Male Athlete of the Year at the conclusion of the 2005–06 athletics season.

Statistics

Professional career
Williams signed as a free agent with the Tiger-Cats before the start of the 2006 season, but playing time was limited during his three years with Hamilton. He saw action in 52 games and was honored as the CFL's Offensive Player of the Week in which he led the Tiger-Cats to a 45–21 rout of the Toronto Argonauts in Week 7 of the 2008 season. After being released from the Tiger-Cats, Williams signed a contract with the Winnipeg Blue Bombers on June 8, 2009. He was released on July 29, 2009.

Statistics

References

External links
CFL profile
ESPN.com college bio

1983 births
American football quarterbacks
Players of Canadian football from South Carolina
Canadian football quarterbacks
Living people
Appalachian State Mountaineers football players
People from Camden, South Carolina
Players of American football from South Carolina
Hamilton Tiger-Cats players